

Chrysler

Four cylinder 
1926–1933: Flathead 4

1981–1995: K Engine

1994–2010: PowerTech

2007–present: World Engine
 1.8, 2.0, and 2.4 "World Engine" (2007–2017)
 2.0 and 2.4 "Tigershark" (2012–present)

Six cylinder 
1924–1959: Flathead 6

1959–2000: Slant-6

1970–1981: Hemi-6 (Australia)

1987–2004: 3.9L/238 LA & Magnum

1989–2011: 3.3 & 3.8 OHV V6

1993–2010: SOHC V6

1998–2010: LH Engine

2002–2013: PowerTech

2010–present: Pentastar

Eight cylinder 
1930–1950: Flathead 8

1951–1958: FirePower (Hemi)

1955–1958: Polyspheric V8

1968–1969: Chrysler Ball-Stud Hemi (A279)

Small block 
1956–1961: A - Chrysler's first small-block V8.

1964–1992: LA

 273
 318
 340
 360

1992–2003: Magnum

 318
 360

1999–2009: PowerTech

2003–present: Hemi

5.7L Hemi - The smallest modern Hemi engine, called the Eagle, introduced in 2002.
6.1L Hemi - A larger modern Hemi, 2004–2010.
6.4L Hemi - A larger bore modern Hemi engine, called the Apache, introduced in 2011.
6.2L Hemi - A supercharged Hemi engine, called the Hellcat, introduced in 2014.
6.2L Hemi - A supercharged Hemi engine, called the Demon, introduced in 2017.

Big block 
1958 - 1978: B

 350
 361
 383
 400

1959–1978: RB

 383
 413
 426 Wedge
 440

1964–1971: Hemi

 426

V10 
Viper V10 - An evolution of the LA design, executed in aluminium.

Magnum V10 - A similar cast-iron engine was made for Dodge Ram trucks.

Turbine 
1954–1980: Turbine Engine

AMC 
Chrysler acquired a number of engines after acquiring AMC in 1987.

Four cylinder 

 1987–2002: AMC I-4

Six cylinder 

AMC I-6

V8 

 AMC 360 - American Motors' "GEN-3" V8s were introduced for the 1970 model year in AMC passenger automobiles. The "GEN-3" engines were available in Jeep utility vehicles starting in 1971. It is not the same as Chrysler's 360 V8. Chrysler continued production of the AMC 360 engine after the 1987 buyout of AMC to power the full-size Jeep Wagoneer (SJ) SUV that was produced until 1991. It was one of the last carbureted car/truck engines built in North America. Chrysler never used this engine in any other vehicle.

Cummins

Six cylinder

Cummins B-Series 
6BT - 5.9 L Diesel I6 used in 1989–1998 Dodge Ram
ISB - 5.9 L Diesel I6 used in 1998–2007 Dodge Ram
ISB6.7 - 6.7 L Diesel I6 currently used in Dodge Ram

Mitsubishi

Three cylinder 

 Mitsubishi 3A92 1.2 L - Used in the Dodge Attitude (2015–present)

Four cylinder 

Orion G12B 1.4
Orion G15B 1.5
Orion 4G15 1.5
Saturn 4G32 1.6
Saturn G32B 1.6
Sirius 4G61 1.6 DOHC
Saturn 4G37 1.8
Astron G52B 2.0
Sirius 4G63 2.0 DOHC
Sirius G63B 2.0
Sirius 4G64 2.4
Astron G54B 2.6

Six cylinder 

1978–1979: 6DR5
2.5 L 6G73 - Used in the Chrysler Sebring, Dodge Avenger, Chrysler Cirrus, and Dodge Stratus
3.0 L 6G72 - Used in the Plymouth Acclaim/Dodge Spirit and 1987–2000 Dodge Caravan/Plymouth Voyager, also Dodge Dynasty, Chrysler LeBaron, Chrysler TC, Chrysler New Yorker, Dodge Daytona, Dodge Stealth, Chrysler Sebring (Coupe), Dodge Stratus (Coupe), Dodge Shadow ES, and Plymouth Duster

Mercedes-Benz

Four cylinder 

OM611 -  diesel (2002–2004)
OM646 -  diesel (2004–2010)
OM651 -  diesel (2011–present)

Five cylinder 

 OM647 -  diesel

V6 

 OM642 - 3.0 L diesel V6 used in 2006–2010 Chrysler 300, 2005–2010 Jeep Grand Cherokee and 2006–2010 Jeep Commander
 M112 E32 - 3.2 L V6 used in 2003-2007 Chrysler Crossfire.
 M112 E32 ML - Supercharged 3.2 L V6 used in 2005-2006 Chrysler Crossire SRT-6.

V12 

 M120 V12 - Used for the Chrysler ME Four-Twelve.

VM Motori

Four cylinder 

425 OHV  diesel
R425 DOHC  diesel
R428 DOHC  diesel
RA428 DOHC  diesel
A428 DOHC  diesel

Five cylinder 

 531 OHV -  diesel

V6 

A630 DOHC -  3.0L diesel  V6 (EU-spec) currently used in Jeep Grand Cherokee and Chrysler 300/Lancia Thema
L630 DOHC -  3.0L diesel  V6 (US-spec) used in Jeep Grand Cherokee and Ram 1500

Fiat

Three cylinder 

Firefly 1.0 L Turbo Multiair II (2018–present)
Firefly 1.0 L BSG MHEV (2020–present)

Four cylinder 

FIRE 1.4 L Turbo Multiair (2012–present)
Firefly 1.3 L Turbo Multiair II (2018–present)
E.torQ  1.6 and 1.8 L (2014–present)
Multijet 1.6, 2.0, and 2.2L diesel (2014–present)
Multijet 3.0L Iveco JTD diesel (2014–present)

PRV (Peugeot, Renault, Volvo)

V6 

 1989–1990: 3.0L PRV engine

Hyundai

Four cylinder 
Hyundai Alpha engine 1.4 and 1.6 L (used in 2005-2018 Dodge Attitude)

Others 
Chrysler UK
1.5 L Hillman four
Renault
J8S  diesel
Douvrin 
Volkswagen 
1.7 L
2.0 TDI PD diesel
Simca Type 315
Tritec 1.6 (1999–2007)

References

Chrysler engines
Lists of automobile engines